The 2020–21 Hampton Pirates men's basketball team represented Hampton University in the 2020–21 NCAA Division I men's basketball season. The Pirates, led by 12th-year head coach Edward Joyner, Jr., played their home games at the Hampton Convocation Center in Hampton, Virginia as members of the Big South Conference.

Previous season
The Pirates finished the 2019–20 season 15–19, 8–10 in Big South play to finish in a tie for fifth place. In the first round of the Big South tournament, they defeated Longwood, advancing to the semifinals, where they upset the top-seeded Radford, to clinch their spot in the Big South tournament championship game. There, they squared up against Winthrop, dropping the game, 68–76.

Roster

Schedule and results 

|-
!colspan=12 style=| Non-conference regular season

|-
!colspan=12 style=| Big South Conference regular season

|-
!colspan=12 style=| Big South tournament
|-

|-

Source

References

Hampton Pirates men's basketball seasons
Hampton Pirates
Hampton Pirates men's basketball
Hampton Pirates men's basketball